Wimmeria acuminata is a species of plant in the family Celastraceae. It is endemic to the Mexican state of Chiapas.

References

acuminata
Endemic flora of Mexico
Trees of Chiapas
Endangered plants
Endangered biota of Mexico
Taxonomy articles created by Polbot
Plants described in 1967